"Let Your Heart Do All the Talking" is a song by Swedish pop group A-Teens. It was planned to be released in June 2003 by Stockholm Records as the third single from the group's final studio album, New Arrival. Only 80 promo copies were pressed and distributed before the commercial release was cancelled for unknown reasons. The song had previously been included on the group's third studio album in the United States, Pop 'til You Drop!

Track listing

References

A-Teens songs
2003 singles
2003 songs
Songs written by Tommy Tysper